Gérard (or Girard) Thibault of Antwerp (ca. 1574–1627) was a fencing master and writer of the 1628 rapier manual Academie de l'Espée. He was from the part of the Netherlands under Habsburg control. His manual is one of the most detailed and elaborate extant sources on rapier combat, painstakingly utilizing geometry and logic to defend his unorthodox style of swordsmanship.

Academie de l'Espée describes a unique system of combat whose closest known relative is the contemporary Spanish school of swordsmanship, also known as La Verdadera Destreza, as taught by masters such as Don Jerónimo Sánchez de Carranza and Luis Pacheco de Narváez. Not unlike the Spanish, Thibault advocated the use of upright postures, walking steps instead of lunges, and non-linear footwork. However, Thibault differed from his Spanish counterparts in many areas, including his preferred stance and grip.

Biography

Details about Thibault's life are sparse, derived from his book and his album amicorum. The latter contains handwritten notes and celebratory poems from Thibault's friends, relatives, pupils, and colleagues, included among whom are several contemporary fencing masters.

Thibault was born in or around 1574 in Antwerp, son of Hendrick Thibaut and Margaretha van Nispen. Although his father used the surname "Thibaut," Gérard used the French form "Thibault." Hendrick Thibaut came from a well-known family in Ypres, living in Ghent and Antwerp before going into exile in the northern Netherlands. Henrick's eldest son, Christiaen, founded the noble family Thibaut van Aegtekerke.

Thibault first studied swordsmanship in Antwerp under Lambert van Someren, who taught between the years of 1564 and 1584.
In 1605, Thibault was a wool merchant in Sanlúcar de Barrameda, south of Seville on the Guadalquivir river, and the hometown of Jerónimo Sánchez de Carranza. There, he took an interest in swordsmanship, studying the Spanish rapier system of Destreza.

Thibault left Spain to return to the Netherlands, and was in Amsterdam as early as 1610. In or around 1611, he presented his system to an assembly of Dutch masters at a competition in Rotterdam. Thibault won first prize, earning an invitation to the court of Prince Maurice of Nassau, where the Prince observed Thibault's system in a multi-day demonstration.

Although initially met with skepticism, Thibault convinced his fellow Dutch fencing masters, including Johannes Damius of Haarlem, Dirck van Stervergen of Leiden, Cornelis Cornelisz van Heusden of Amsterdam, and Thibault's former teacher Lambert von Someron.
In 1615, Thibault was invited to the court at Cleves and left Amsterdam, where he once again demonstrated his system successfully. Over the next several years, Thibault traveled from Cleves, Amsterdam, to Spain, back to Amsterdam, and finally to Leiden in 1622. There, Thibault studied mathematics at Leiden University. It is unclear whether Thibault taught his system at the university. It is during his time in Leiden that Thibault likely began working on Academie de l'Espée and employed a team of sixteen master engravers.

Academie de l'Espée
Thibault's only known work was a rapier manual whose full title can be translated as Academy of the Sword: wherein is demonstrated by mathematical rules on the foundation of a mysterious circle the theory and practice of the true and heretofore unknown secrets of handling arms on foot and horseback. Despite its frontispiece, which lists the year 1628, the manual was not published until 1630, a year after Thibault's death. Thibault was Dutch, but because Academie de l'Espée was written in French and describes a variant on the Spanish school of swordsmanship, it has often been mistaken as an alternately French or Spanish work.

Academie de l'Espée is widely considered to be the most lavishly-illustrated swordsmanship manual ever produced. A team of master engravers were employed to produce plates for all forty-four chapters of the treatise, containing about twelve to fifteen pairs of swordsmen per instructional plate. These plates contain a wide variety of intricate backgrounds and costumes which appear to be purely decorative. The controversial 19th century fencing historian Egerton Castle described Academie de l'Espée as "without exception, the most elaborate treatise on swordsmanship, and probably one of the most marvellous printed works extant, from a typographic and artistic point of view" yet simultaneously dismissed the manual as nothing more than a "bibliographic curiosity."

Academie de l'Espée was translated into English by John Michael Greer and published by The Chivalry Bookshelf
in 2006.  A book release party was held in Medford, Oregon, at Barnes & Noble and included lectures by John Michael Greer and demonstrations of the fencing method by local historic fencing school Academia Duellatoria.

A reprint of the Academy of the Sword (translated by John Michael Greer) became available in March 2017 from Karnac Books.

Academie de l'Espée was translated into Russian language by Scientific Research Institute "World Martial Art Traditions & Criminalistic Research of Weapon Use" in August 2017, now is available the book Academy of the Sword

The Mysterious Circle

Thibault's treatise is notable for its highly logical, mathematical approach to swordplay. He discussed at great length the precise geometric relationships between opposing swordsmen, always stressing the importance of natural proportion. These relationships are expressed through a circular diagram that Thibault refers to as the "mysterious circle," visible on the floor in most of the plates in Academie de l'Espée.

Every element of the circle is proportional to the swordsman's body. For example, if the swordsman were to stand with his feet together and arm extended (but not locked) straight upward and pointing his index finger, then the diameter of the circle would be equal to his height as measured from the soles of his feet to his extended finger. The swordsman's ideal blade length should not exceed 1/2 of this length, or the radius of the circle. All measurements in Thibault's system, including ideal length of step, proper distance from an opponent of equal height and sword length, and so on, are expressed in this diagram.

The circle is not only used to determine the proper length of one's swords, steps, and distance, but also as a teaching aid to express in precise terms how and where to step in relation to the opponent in order to produce the desired effect. This allows for a kind of geometric shorthand, whereby Thibault can simply refer to a location by the nearest intersection in the diagram. Because of its use as a stepping guide, Thibault details how to draw such a proportional circle on the ground for the reader's own use with nothing other than basic tools.

The sword
Thibault's preferred weapon was the rapier, and he described its use against a multitude of opposing weapons such as rapier and dagger, longsword, and even early firearms. Although many of his contemporaries provided instruction in the use of offhand weapons, Thibault only gave instruction in the use of a single weapon, believing it capable of defeating all other weapons and weapon combinations.

Thibault wrote at length about the optimum length of a sword, concluding that its blade must not exceed the height of the swordsman's navel when standing naturally. This blade length also corresponds exactly to the radius of Thibault's circle. This maximum length seems to be a reaction to the overly long blades that had become fashionable in Thibault's time, and it is perhaps because of this fashion that Thibault wrote in detail of a maximum length, but did not feel the need to include a minimum.

The guard
Despite the popularity of increasingly complex hilts, Thibault's ideal hilt was relatively simple. It featured straight quillons, equal in length to the sole of the swordsman's foot, as well as finger rings and side rings, with little else. Thibault gives proportional measurements for the various components of the hilt, each based on his circle diagram. These measurements dictate that the sword's quillons are to equal the length of one's foot, the combined length of pommel and grip should equal exactly twice the length of the guard from the quillons forward, and so on. Most notably, Thibault's sword lacks a knuckle bow in order to allow his unorthodox method of gripping the sword.  The knuckle bow interferes with the wrist when holding the sword in Thibault's primary straight arm grip.

Gripping the sword
Thibault described a unique method of gripping the sword which allows for many of his other innovations. Whereas Thibault's contemporaries tended to grasp a sword with one or two fingers wrapped around the fore quillon, inside the finger ring aligned with the sword's true edge, Thibault's grip involves resting the ricasso on the index finger, with the tip of the thumb resting on the rear quillon. The blade is thus aligned horizontally when the arm is extended. Thibault's system does not rely entirely upon this grip, sometimes dropping the thumb beneath the quillon with the index finger wrapped around the fore quillon. This latter curved or bent arm grip is similar, if not identical, to the grip for which most of Thibault's contemporaries advocated.  Thibault uses this grip for cutting and for defending at close range.

Thibault's stance
In his primary stance (the posture of the straight line), Thibault describes an upright posture which allows for fluid, graceful motion while remaining profiled to the opponent. Thibault argues in favor of a "natural" stance, similar to an ordinary posture while standing or walking. This involves holding the feet several inches apart, at an angle of roughly 45 degrees to one another. Unusually, Thibault does not believe that the toes of the front foot should be pointed at the opponent, rather being pointed to the angle of the interior subjection (Thibault's method of pushing the opponent's sword down and aside). Thibault describes the placement of the feet in relation to an imaginary line drawn between a swordsman and his opponent (Thibault calls this line the "diameter"). The swordsman's back foot would be perpendicular to this line, while his front foot would angle inward, with the weight distributed evenly on the balls of the feet. This positioning of the front foot allows you to walk into the subjection.

Both shoulders are held in alignment and fully profiled to the opponent. The sword arm, normally extended but not locked, is also in alignment with the shoulders. The rear arm remains largely unused in order to maintain this profile, with the rear arm extended and the hand pointing downward and back.

Although the posture described above can be considered his "default" stance, Thibault also makes use of postures which involve bending the arm and/or spreading the feet farther apart.

Thibault's subjection
Thibault, when going against a similar posture (the posture of the straight line), advocates a subjection to either the inside or outside of the arm.

Subjection is executed by advancing the hilt past the opponent's point, raising your own point and angling the rapier across and above the opponent's blade.

In the case of the inside line, the primary target becomes the opponent flank and the attack presses the opponent's blade downward and to his own outside line; on the outside line, the primary target becomes the opponent's head, pressing his blade outwards during the attack. How the opponent responds to this is then gauged by sensitivity, Thibault identifying several different pressures of sentiment and the correct way to enter against them.

See also
 Destreza

Notes

Sources

 Thibault, Gérard. Academy of the Sword, trans. John Michael Greer (Highland Park, TX: The Chivalry Bookshelf, 2006)
 de la Verwey, Herman Fontaine. "Gerard Thibault and his Academie de l'Espée," Quaerendo VIII (1978) pp. 284–319
Castle, Egerton. Schools and masters of fence from the Middle Ages to the eighteenth century. (1885) p. 122.
 "Академия меча" Жерар Тибо Т 39 — Днепр: Середняк Т. К., 2017, — 536 с. 

d'Anvers
Renaissance writers
Dutch male fencers
Historical European martial arts
1570s births
1627 deaths
Sportspeople from Antwerp
People of the Spanish Netherlands